Ann Schlee FRSL (born 1934) is an English novelist. She won the annual Guardian Children's Fiction Prize for The Vandal (1979), a once-in-a-lifetime book award judged by a panel of British children's writers. She was elected Fellow of the Royal Society of Literature in 1997.

Early years and education
As a child, Ann Schlee was brought up in the United States by her mother and grandparents until the end of the Second World War. Afterward she began to settle in Cairo, Egypt, with her parents. They later moved to Sudan and Eritrea. Inter alia she attended boarding school in England and later studied at Somerville College, Oxford.

Career
Schlee has spent much of her writing career in London being quite active in the 1970s to the 1990s.

Awards and honours
The Vandal (Macmillan, 1980) is a science fiction novel set in the future. Beside winning the 1980 Guardian Prize it was a commended runner up for the Carnegie Medal from the Library Association, recognising the year's best children's book by a British subject.

Rhine Journey (Henry Holt & Co, 1981) was shortlisted for the 1981 Booker Prize, recognising the year's best novel.

Personal life
Ann Schlee lives with her husband, the artist Nick Schlee, in Berkshire. They have four children.

Selected works
Schlee has written a number of books including:

 The Strangers (1971)
 The Consul's Daughter (1972)
 Guns of Darkness (1973)
 Ask Me No Questions (1979)
 The Vandal (Macmillan, 1980)
 Rhine Journey (Henry Holt & Co, 1981)
 The Proprietor (1983)
 Laing (1987)
 The Proprietor (1996)
 The Time in Aderra (Macmillan, 1998)

See also

Notes

References

External links
 

 

1934 births
Living people
Place of birth missing (living people)
Alumni of Somerville College, Oxford
English women novelists
English children's writers
Guardian Children's Fiction Prize winners
Fellows of the Royal Society of Literature